Beluga Noble Russian Vodka is a brand of Russian Vodka created in the Mariinsk distillery.

History

Beluga Noble Russian Vodka was first created in 2002 by the Mariinsk distillery. Mariinsk itself was founded in 1900 in Siberia.

In May 2016, Beluga partnered with Summergate Fine Wine & Spirits to be the exclusive importer and distributor of the brand in Greater China.

March 11, 2022 President Joe Biden issued an executive order blocking U.S. imports of key Russian products, including vodka, and banning exports of high-end goods to Russia.

Process

Water is a key component in the production of Beluga Vodka, accounting for 60% of its formula. They pull from artesian water sources. Another component is a special (Wheat) malt spirit.

Flavors

There are six flavors of Beluga, Noble, Transatlantic, Allure, Goldline, Celebration and Beluga Epicure by Lalique.

References

External links

Russian vodkas
Russian brands